Sue Webber is a Scottish Conservative politician who has been a Member of the Scottish Parliament (MSP) for the Lothian region since May 2021.

Early life and Political career
Webber was born and raised in Edinburgh. She attended Currie High School and Edinburgh University.

Webber was elected as Councillor for the Pentland Hills ward on City of Edinburgh Council in the 2017 council election. She was the Conservatives' transport spokeswoman in the Council.

On 20 November 2020, Webber was chosen as the Conservative candidate for Edinburgh Western at the upcoming Scottish Parliament election. but faced deselection calls in March 2021 after WhatsApp messages that were highly critical of COVID-19 restrictions were leaked.

On 8 May 2021, she was elected as a Member of the Scottish Parliament (MSP) for Lothian. She is the Scottish Conservative Shadow Secretary for drugs policy.

References

External links 
 

Year of birth missing (living people)
Living people
People educated at Currie High School
Politicians from Edinburgh
Conservative MSPs
Members of the Scottish Parliament 2021–2026
Female members of the Scottish Parliament
Scottish Conservative Party councillors
Councillors in Edinburgh
Women councillors in Scotland